Events from the year 1871 in China.

Incumbents
 Tongzhi Emperor (11th year)
 Regent: Empress Dowager Cixi

Events 
 Miao Rebellion (1854–73)
 Dungan Revolt (1862–77)
 Panthay Rebellion ends
 May 1873 — Momien besieged and stormed by imperial troops in, their resistance broke completely. Gov. Ta-sa-kon was captured and executed by order of the Imperial government.
 Beiyang Fleet created
 Mudan incident in Taiwan
 Tongzhi Restoration

Births 

 August 14 – Guangxu Emperor, emperor of China (d. 1908)
 Qiu Yufang, revolutionary, writer and feminist (d. 1904)

References